Óscar Osvaldo Aguirregaray Acosta (born 25 October 1959) is a former Uruguayan footballer who played as a defender for Uruguay national team. At club level, he has played for Nacional, Defensor Sporting, Internacional de Porto Alegre, Palmeiras, Figueirense and Peñarol. In 2006, he was head coach of Club Atlético River Plate in Uruguay alongside Pablo Bengoechea.

International career
Aguirregaray made ten appearances for the Uruguay national football team from 1995 to 1997, having played earlier in 1987 for the Uruguayan Olympic team.  He was a member of the Uruguayan squad for the 1987 Copa América but he did not play.

Honours

Nacional

 Copa Libertadores: 1980
 Primera División (Uruguay): 1980, 1983
 Intercontinental Cup: 1980
 Liguilla Pre-Libertadores de América: 1982

Uruguay

 Copa América: 1987 e 1995

Defensor Sporting

 Primera División (Uruguay): 1987, 1991
 Liguilla Pre-Libertadores de América: 1991

Peñarol

 Primera División (Uruguay): 1994, 1995, 1996, 1997 e 1999
 Liguilla Pre-Libertadores de América: 1994 e 1997

References

Living people
1959 births
People from Artigas Department
Uruguayan people of Basque descent
Uruguayan footballers
Uruguayan expatriate footballers
Uruguay international footballers
Uruguayan Primera División players
Club Nacional de Football players
Defensor Sporting players
Peñarol players
Sport Club Internacional players
Sociedade Esportiva Palmeiras players
Figueirense FC players
1987 Copa América players
1995 Copa América players
Expatriate footballers in Brazil
Uruguayan football managers
River Plate Montevideo managers
Copa América-winning players
Copa Libertadores-winning players
Association football defenders